The 2016 NCAA Division I Tennis Championships will be the men's and women's tennis tournaments played concurrently from May 19 to May 30, 2016 in Tulsa, Oklahoma on the campus of the University of Tulsa. It will be the 71st edition of the NCAA Division I Men's Tennis Championship and the 35th edition of the NCAA Division I Women's Tennis Championship. It will be the eleventh time that the men's and women's tournaments were held at the same venue. It will consist of a men's and women's team, singles, and doubles championships.

Men's team championship
Note: Matches from the First Round and Second Round are held at the home courts of the national seeds with the winning team advancing to the championship rounds in Tulsa, Oklahoma. Bold indicates that a team is still active.

National seeds

1.  Virginia (National Champions)
2.  North Carolina (quarterfinals)
3.  UCLA (quarterfinals)
4.  TCU (round of16)
5.  Ohio State (quarterfinals)
6.  Wake Forest (round of 16)
7.  Georgia (semifinals)
8.  Texas Tech (second round)
9.  Florida (quarterfinals)
10. USC (round of 16)
11. Oklahoma (Runner-up)
12. Texas A&M (second round)
13. California (semifinals)
14. Northwestern (second round)
15. Illinois (second round)
16. Oklahoma State (round of 16)

Bracket

All-tournament team

Women's team championship
Note: Matches from the First Round and Second Round are held at the home courts of the national seeds with the winning team advancing to the championship rounds in Tulsa, Oklahoma. Bold indicates that a team is still active.

National seeds

1. California (semifinals) 
2. Florida (round of 16)  
3. North Carolina (round of 16) 
4. Ohio State (quarterfinals)

5. Georgia (round of 16) 
6. Vanderbilt (semifinals) 
7. Miami (FL) (round of 16) 
8. Pepperdine (quarterfinals) 

9. Duke (second round) 
10. Michigan (quarterfinals) 
11. Auburn (round of 16)  
12. Oklahoma State (Runner-up)

13. South Carolina (second round) 
14. Virginia (quarterfinals) 
15. Stanford (National Champions)
16. Texas Tech (round of 16)

Bracket

All-tournament team

Men's singles championship

National seeds

  Mikael Torpegaard, Ohio State (final)
  Roberto Cid, South Florida (quarterfinals)
  Dominik Köpfer, Tulane (third round)
  Aleksandar Vukic, Illinois (quarterfinals)
  Cameron Norrie, TCU (semifinals)
  Mackenzie McDonald, UCLA (National Champion)
  Christopher Eubanks, Georgia Tech (first round)
  Ryan Shane, Virginia (third round)

Players ranked 9th–16th, listed by last name
  Tom Fawcett, Stanford (second round)
  Diego Hidalgo, Florida (first round)
  Thai-Son Kwiatkowski, Virginia (quarterfinals)
  Julian Lenz, Baylor (first round)
  Benjamin Lock, Florida State (second round)
  Skander Mansouri, Wake Forest (third round)
  João Monteiro, Virginia Tech (semifinals)
  Austin Smith, Georgia (first round)

Finals
For full bracket:

Top half

Bottom half

Women's singles championship

National seeds

Bracket

Men's doubles championship

National seeds

Bracket

Women's doubles championship

National seeds

Bracket

References

NCAA Division I tennis championships
NCAA